The Kanawha Valley Regional Transportation Authority, commonly known as "KRT" is the city bus system for the Charleston, West Virginia, United States metropolitan area.

The tax supported system was founded in 1971 after the Greyhound Corporation and the privately owned Charleston Transit Company ceased intra-city bus service following a strike.

The system ranges throughout the Charleston metro area, from Montgomery, West Virginia in the south east, about 45 miles west to Nitro, West Virginia.  All buses centralize on the former Laidley Street in downtown Charleston, which is now known as the Transit Mall and is restricted to buses only.

The KRT also was involved in a Joint Venture with the Tri-State Transit Authority known as Intelligent Transit which provides a link between Charleston and Huntington, West Virginia, but this ended in 2015 due to low ridership.

Routes
All routes except No. 9 depart from Downtown Charleston. Route 9 connects to Route 2 at Cabin Creek Junction and to Route 22 at Quincy Walmart and Montgomery.

Electric buses 
Public transportation officials hope that a small fleet of new hybrid electric-diesel buses. The seven new vehicles were purchased with funding provided by the federal Diesel Emissions Reduction Act, as well as $1.73 million in stimulus funds awarded to the state Department of Environmental Protection and the state Department of Transportation's Division of Public Transit.

References

External links

 KRT history

Charleston, West Virginia metropolitan area
Bus transportation in West Virginia
Hybrid electric buses
Transit authorities with electric buses
Transportation in Kanawha County, West Virginia
Transit agencies in West Virginia
1971 establishments in West Virginia